Chansons pour toutes sortes de monde (Songs for All Kinds of People) is a 1990 album by Canadian songwriter Plume Latraverse.

Track listing
In vitro
Le retour d'Hector
Divinette
Jardin du rêve
Le ramoneur
Chatte de daure
La tarentelle della tarentule
Dans la piaule de Louis
Pollusonge
La chute du prince
J'ai vendu ma chèvre
Tant qu'on pourra...
Popsicles, Les
Histoire transparente
Une bonne fille
Bandrifulement
Les culottes de singe
Euthanazie
La java des dieux
Une affaire de famille
Pattes de lune
Music from Les Vacances de M. Hulot by Alain Romans; lyrics by Plume Latraverse
En attendant l'huile
Le mal du pays
Suite
Les zarchitectes
La ballade de Sandale et Gandhi
Ton enfance nous quitte
Le trésor du docteur Landru
Le Joyeux Misanthrope (la complainte du gars qui haït tout pis qui aime rien) 
Song only available on the cassette version of the album

1990 albums
Plume Latraverse albums